Carrsbrook is a historic home and farm complex located near Charlottesville, Albemarle County, Virginia.  The main house was built about 1785, and is a five-part Palladian style dwelling. It has a central, projecting -story, three-bay-wide section flanked by -story, single-bay wings connected by hyphens.  The front facade features a single-story dwarf portico, supported by Doric order columns. From 1798 to 1815 the house served as the residence and school of Thomas Jefferson's ward and nephew, Peter Carr.

It was added to the National Register of Historic Places in 1982.

References

External links

Carrsbrook, South Fork River vicinity, Charlottesville, Charlottesville, VA: 5 photos and 2 data pages at Historic American Buildings Survey

Houses on the National Register of Historic Places in Virginia
Palladian Revival architecture in Virginia
Houses completed in 1785
Houses in Albemarle County, Virginia
National Register of Historic Places in Albemarle County, Virginia
Historic American Buildings Survey in Virginia